Joanna "Joie" Faye Leigh (born 22 February 1993) is an English international field hockey player who played as a midfielder for England and Great Britain.

She plays club hockey in the Women's England Hockey League Premier Division for Hampstead & Westminster

Leigh has also played for Clifton Robinsons.

References

External links

1993 births
Living people
English female field hockey players
Women's England Hockey League players